Theekkanal is a 1976 Indian Malayalam film, directed by Madhu and produced by George Thomas. The film stars Madhu, Srividya, Mohan Sharma and Pattom Sadan. The film's musical score is by K. J. Yesudas. The film was remade in Tamil as Dheepam with Sivaji Ganesan, in Telugu as Amaradeepam with Krishnam Raju, in Hindi as Amardeep with Rajesh Khanna and in Kannada as Amara Jyothi with Ambareesh.

Cast
 
Madhu 
Srividya 
Mohan Sharma 
Pattom Sadan 
Sankaradi 
Kanakadurga 
Vidhubala

Soundtrack
The music was composed by K. J. Yesudas with lyrics written by Vayalar.

Box office
The film was commercial success.

References

External links
 

1976 films
1970s Malayalam-language films
Malayalam films remade in other languages